Jeffrey Klein may refer to:

 Jeffrey D. Klein (born 1960), New York State Senator
 Jeffrey A. Klein, American dermatologist
 Jeffrey Bruce Klein (born 1948), investigative journalist who co-founded Mother Jones magazine
 Jeff Klein (born 1976), American singer/songwriter